Croatian Catholic Radio (HKR) is a non-profit Croatian radio station with a statewide concession. The founder and owner of the radio station is the Croatian Bishops' Conference. The station started broadcasting on May 17, 1997 when it was blessed by the Cardinal Franjo Kuharić, then president of the Croatian Bishops' Conference.

References

External links 
 

Radio stations in Croatia
Catholic Church in Croatia
Radio stations established in 1997
Catholic radio stations
Mass media in Zagreb
1997 establishments in Croatia